Low Roar is the self-titled debut album by the American-Icelandic musical project Low Roar, released on November 1, 2011, through Tonequake Records. "Help Me" was featured in the animated documentary film Flee.

Music and style 
Low Roar can be described as a post-rock, ambient and folk-rock album. The album is based on musician Ryan Karazija's move to Iceland, who was formerly of the indie rock band Audrye Sessions, as well as the change and introversion of fall.

Recording and production 
After moving from Livermore, California to Reykjavík, lead singer Ryan Karazija, formerly of the American indie rock band Audrye Sessions, chronicled the difficulty of acclimating to a foreign land, finding work, and supporting his family by writing a song each day.

The album was recorded with nothing more than a laptop in Ryan's kitchen in Reykjavík, as a result of having a very low budget after moving to Iceland.

Track listing

References

2011 albums
Low Roar albums